The following is a list of notable deaths in March 2005.

Entries for each day are listed alphabetically by surname. A typical entry lists information in the following sequence:
 Name, age, country of citizenship at birth, subsequent country of citizenship (if applicable), reason for notability, cause of death (if known), and reference.

March 2005

1
Edmund Adams, 90, English cricketer.
Cissy van Bennekom, 93, Dutch film actress.
George "Wild Child" Butler, 68, American blues musician.
Sergio Campanato, 75, Italian mathematician.
Reverend Walter Halloran, 83, American priest who participated in the exorcism on which The Exorcist was based.
Brian Luckhurst, 66, English cricketer, cancer.
Peter Malkin, 77, Israeli Mossad agent, the man who captured Adolf Eichmann.
Stephen Anthony Mobley, 39, American convicted murderer, executed by lethal injection.

2
Bala Bredin, 88, British army general.
Martin Denny, 93, American founder of exotica musical genre, bandleader.
Hermann Dörnemann, 111, German supercentenarian and World War I veteran, oldest living person in Germany, heart failure.
Tillie K. Fowler, 62, U.S. politician, former four-term Florida congresswoman.
Rick Mahler, 51, American baseball pitcher, heart attack.

3
George Atkinson, 69,  American businessman, inventor of the video rental.
James Corbett, 96, Australian politician.
Max M. Fisher, 96, American millionaire philanthropist, listed in Forbes 400.
Rinus Michels, 77, Dutch football player and coach, former Netherlands national football team coach.
Raveendran, 61, Indian composer and playback singer.
Guylaine St. Onge, 39, Canadian actress (Earth: Final Conflict, Fast Track, Angel Eyes), cancer.
Brock Myrol, 29, RCMP officer.

4
Mihai Brediceanu, 84, Romanian musician.
Nicola Calipari, 51, Italian intelligence officer, shot by the US Army in Iraq.
Douglas Dumbleton, 86, New Zealand cricket umpire.
Una Hale, 82, Australian operatic soprano.
Yuri Kravchenko, 53, Ukrainian General of Internal Service and statesman, former interior minister of Ukraine.
Carlos Sherman, 70, Uruguayan-born Belarusian translator and writer.

5
George Worsley Adamson, 92, American-born British illustrator.
Harold Brooks-Baker, 71, American publishing director of Burke's Peerage Limited.
Sergiu Comissiona, 76, Romanian orchestra conductor.
Morris Engel, 86, American photographer, cinematographer and filmmaker.
Vance Gerry, 75, American animator and screenwriter (The Aristocats, Hercules, The Fox and the Hound).
James McGirr Kelly, 76, American federal judge.
David Sheppard, Baron Sheppard of Liverpool, 75, English former international cricketer and Church of England bishop, cancer.

6
Larned B. Asprey, 85, American chemist.
Hans Bethe, 98, German-born American Nobel Laureate in Physics, discover of stellar fusion.
Danny Gardella, 85, American baseball player, New York Giants outfielder.
Gladys Marín, 63, Chilean communist politician, cancer.
Keith Rawle, 80, Australian rules footballer.
Chuck Thompson, 83, American Baltimore Orioles broadcaster, complications of massive stroke.
Tommy Vance, 64, British radio DJ and TV host, stroke.
Teresa Wright, 86, American actress (Mrs. Miniver, Shadow of a Doubt, The Best Years of Our Lives, Oscar winner (1943), heart attack.

7
Walter Arendt, 80, German politician.
A. W. Baxter, 78, Canadian winemaker.
Helon Blount, 76, American musical theatre actress, born in Texas.
John Box, 85, British production designer (Lawrence of Arabia, Doctor Zhivago, Oliver!), 4-time Oscar winner.
Terry Buck, 61, Australian swimmer.
Debra Hill, 54, American screenwriter and film producer (Halloween, Escape from New York, The Fisher King).
Bildad Kaggia, 82, Kenyan politician.
Philip Lamantia, 77, American surrealist poet.
Sir Peregrine Rhodes, 79, British diplomat, Ambassador to Greece (1982–1985)
James Stuart, 76, American opera director.

8
Ross Benson, 56, British journalist for the Daily Mail and award-winning foreign correspondent.
Larry Bunker, 76, American jazz drummer.
Anna Haycraft, 72, English writer, lung cancer.
César Lattes, 80, Brazilian physicist, contributed to the physics of elementary particles and discovered the pion.
Aslan Maskhadov, 53, Chechen separatist leader, killed by Russian troops.
Brigitte Mira, 94, German theatrical actress.
Fred Rice, 86, American football coach.
Jeremy Russell, 60, American cofounding member of the band Blue Cheer.

9
Thomas F. August, 78, American lawyer and politician.
Meredith Davies, 82, British conductor.
Glenn Davis, 80, American football player, Heisman Trophy winner, prostate cancer.
Josef Fuchs, 93, German Roman Catholic theologian.
Sheila Gish, 62, English actress (Company, Highlander, Mansfield Park), cancer.
Kathie Kay, 86, Scottish big band singer, Alzheimer's disease.
Chris LeDoux, 56, American country music and rodeo star, complications from liver cancer.
William Murray, 78, American mystery novelist.
István Nyers, 80, Hungarian footballer.
Jeanette Schmid, 80, German-born professional transsexual whistler.
Redmond A. Simonsen, 62, American game designer.

10
Dave Allen, 68, Irish comedian.
Charles R. Baxter, 75, American physician, pneumonia, surgeon who tried to save JFK, pneumonia.
Sir James Beament, 83, British biologist.
Debbi Besserglick, 49, Israeli actress and voice actress, cancer.
Danny Joe Brown, 53, American singer (Molly Hatchet).
Bruno Manser, 45, Swiss environmental activist.
Sy Wexler, 88, American maker of educational films.

11
Rowland Barnes, 64, American jurist, murdered in court.
Karen Wynn Fonstad, 59, American cartographer and academic, author of atlases of fictional worlds, breast cancer.
Len Morgan, 82, American aviator and writer.
Humphrey Spender, 94, British photojournalist, notably for Picture Post.

12
Tony Arena, 86, American football player.
Aleksandar Atanacković, 84, Serbian footballer.
Carl Beck-Friis, 83, Swedish Olympic shooter
Joseph M. Breitenbeck, 90, American Roman Catholic prelate, Bishop of Grand Rapids (1969–1989).
Norbert Callens, 80, Belgian cyclist.
Bill Cameron, 62, Canadian journalist, cancer.
Lisa Fittko, 95, German World War II dissident who led Jews over the Pyrenees to freedom.
Stanley Grenz, 55, American Christian theologian.
Amanullah Khan, 71, Pakistani Test cricket umpire.
Stavros Kouyioumtzis, 73, Greek music composer
Edward E. Simbalist, 61, American role-playing game designer

13
Old Man Bukashkin, 66, Russian poet and artist.
Lyn Collins, 56, American soul singer, aka "Female Preacher"
Jason Evers, 83, American actor, star of B-movie Brain That Wouldn't Die
Ahmed Hassan Diria, 67, Tanzanian politician and diplomat, foreign minister from 1990 to 1993.
Frank House, 75, American baseball player, retired Major League Baseball catcher and Alabama legislator

14
Stan Campbell, 74, American NFL player.
Richard Cooper, 58, Australian jurist.
Richard S. Forrest, 72, American novelist and short story writer, smoking and lung disease.
Janet Reger, 69, British designer of women's lingerie.
Sir Donald Thompson, 73, British politician.
Simon Webb, 55, British chess grandmaster living in Sweden, stabbed to death by his son.
Akira Yoshizawa, 94, Japanese origami master.

15
Bob Bellear, 60, Australian jurist, first indigenous judge in Australia.
Audrey Callaghan, 89, Spouse of the British Prime Minister (1976–1979).
Don Durant, 82, American actor (Johnny Ringo) and singer.
Sante Graziani, 85, American artist and art educator.
Loe de Jong, 90, Dutch historian.
Otar Korkiya, 81, Georgian basketball player.
Bill McGarry, 77, English football manager.
Jim Pearcy, 86, American football player.
Judith Scott, 61, American outsider artist.
Shoji Nishio, 77, Japanese aikido teacher holding the rank of 8th dan shihan from the Aikikai.

16
Wanda Alston, 45, American activist.
Arciso Artesiani, 83, Italian motorcycle racer.
Todd Bell, 47, American football safety, former Chicago Bears player.
Mohammed Bijeh, 30, Iranian serial killer.
Ralph Erskine, 91, British architect (Byker Wall).
Anthony George, 84, American actor.
Allan Hendrickse, 77, South African politician.
Justin Hinds, 62, Jamaican vocalist and songwriter.
William Lehman, 91, American politician, represented Dade County, Florida in U.S. Congress.
Dick Radatz, 67, American baseball player.

17
Renzo Alverà, 72, Italian bobsledder.
William J. Bakrow, 81, American academic administrator.
Irvine Barrow, 92, Canadian accountant and senator.
Gary Bertini, 77, Israeli conductor and composer.
Sir Jeremy Blacker, 65, British army general.
Mike Campbell-Lamerton, 71, British army officer and rugby player.
Royce Frith, 81, Canadian senator.
Prentice Gautt, 67, American former NFL player.
Lalo Guerrero, 88, American father of Chicano music.
Sverre Holm, 73, Norwegian actor.
George F. Kennan, 101, U.S. diplomat and historian.
David Little, 46, American college and professional football player, former Pittsburgh Steelers player.
Andre Norton, 93, American science fiction and fantasy author.
Theodor Uppman, 85, American operatic baritone.

18
Alfred Adcock, 88, English cricketer.
Encarnación Cabré, 93, Spanish archaeologist.
Sol Linowitz, 91, American diplomat and entrepreneur.
Maria Rosseels, 88, Belgian writer and journalist.

19
John DeLorean, 80, American car designer and manufacturer.
John Ebdon, 81, British author, broadcaster and director of the London Planetarium.
Knox Ramsey, 79, American gridiron football player (Chicago Cardinals,  Philadelphia Eagles, Washington Redskins).

20
Ronnie Bird, 63, English footballer (Bradford Park Avenue, Birmingham City).
David Bonser, 71, British Anglican prelate, Bishop of Bolton.
Ted Brown, 80, American radio personality.
Walter Hopps, 72, American art dealer and gallery owner.
Sir Leslie Porter, 84, British businessman (Tesco).
Maynard Jack Ramsay, 90, American entomologist.
Andrew Toti, 89, American inventor of the Mae West inflatable life vest.

21
Rodney Aller, 88, American skier and lawyer.
Fred Blair, 98, American communist politician.
Barney Martin, 82, American actor (Seinfeld, The Producers, Arthur), lung cancer.
Stanley Sadie, 74, English musicologist and critic, Lou Gehrig's disease.
Bobby Short, 80, American cabaret singer and pianist, leukemia.
Jeff Weise, 16, American school shooter, suicide.

22
Abid Azad, 52, Bangladeshi poet.
Vernon Carrington, 68, Jamaican Rastafarian.
Clemente Domínguez y Gómez, 58, Spanish antipope self-proclaimed Gregory XVII in 1978.
Gerald R. Dunn, 70, American politician.
Gemini Ganesan, 84, Indian actor.
Theresa Kobuszewski, 84, American baseball player (All-American Girls Professional Baseball League).
Edward Moskal, 80, American president of the Polish American Congress.
Rod Price, 57, English guitarist (Foghat).
Kenzo Tange, 91, Japanese architect.

23
Rizvan Chitigov, 40, Chechen rebel field commander, K.I.A.
Naftali Halberstam, 74, Polish-born Grand Rabbi of the Bobover Hasidim
Robert L. Hendershott, 106, American numismatist.
David Kossoff, 85, British actor, father of Free guitarist Paul Kossoff
Chen Yi-sein, Sino-Burmese scholar.

24
Lyle Bennett, American football and track coach.
Richard Bowman, 71, English cricketer.
Sir Lindsay Bryson, 80, British admiral.
David P. Bushnell, 91, American entrepreneur, non-Hodgkin's lymphoma.
Elizabeth Girling, 92, English political activist and charity campaigner.
Shelley Mann, 67, American swimmer and Olympic medalist.
Mercedes Pardo, 83, Venezuelan painter.

25
Sir Ronald Forrest, 82, British admiral.
Greg Garrison, 81, American television producer and director (The Dean Martin Show, Your Show of Shows).
David Sanctuary Howard, 77, British expert on Chinese porcelain.
Paul Henning, 93, American television producer (Beverly Hillbillies, Petticoat Junction, Green Acres).
Davis McCaughey, 90, Australian politician, Governor of Victoria, Australia.

26
Achiam, 89, Israeli sculptor.
Melihate Ajeti, 69, Kosovar actress.
David Boone, 53, Canadian football player.
James Callaghan, 92, British politician, Prime Minister (1976–1979), MP (1945–1987).
Harold Cruse, 89, American academic and social critic.
Gérard Filion, 95, Canadian businessman and journalist.
Paul Hester, 46, Australian drummer (Crowded House, Split Enz), suicide.
Allison Green, 93, American politician.
Marius Russo, 90, American baseball pitcher, member of 1941 and 1943 World Series New York Yankees teams.
Georgeanna Seegar Jones, 92, American scientist and endocrinologist.
Osias Tager, 90, British businessman.

27
Wilfred Gordon Bigelow, 91, Canadian heart surgeon.
Gwydion Brooke, 93, British bassoonist.
Bob Casey, 79, American PA announcer for the Minnesota Twins.
Grant Johannesen, 83, American classical pianist and composer.
Antonio Tellez, 84, Spanish anarchist historian and journalist.
Rigo Tovar, 58, Mexican singer and composer.
Ahmad Zaki, 56, Egyptian actor, lung cancer.

28
Raffaello Baldini, 80, Italian writer and poet.
Tom Bevill, 84, American politician, former US Congressman from Alabama.
Said Dimayev, 65, Soviet/Russian composer of  Chechen descent.
Dave Freeman, 82, British scriptwriter (Benny Hill, Carry On films, etc.).
Pál Losonczi, 85, Hungarian Communist political figure, former chairman of the Presidential Council of Hungary (head of state).
Dame Moura Lympany, 89, British classical pianist.
Yesmore Mutero, 25, Zimbabwean footballer (women's national team), AIDS-related illness.
Eula Pearl Carter Scott, 89, American stunt pilot and political activist.
Robin Spry, 65, Canadian film and television producer and screenwriter, road accident.

29
Johnnie Cochran, 67, American lawyer, defended O. J. Simpson, brain cancer.
Edward D. Head, 85, American Roman Catholic prelate, Bishop of Buffalo (1973–1995).
Howell Heflin, 83, American politician, U.S. Senator from Alabama.
George Matthews, 88,  British journalist and political activist.
Clive McLean, 60, English adult photographer.

30
Roy Askevold, 69, Norwegian boxer.
Arieh Atzmoni, 78, Israeli soldier.
Ivor Brown, 77, British motorcycle speedway rider and writer.
Robert Creeley, 78, American poet, complications from respiratory disease.
Emil Dimitrov, 64, Bulgarian singer and musician.
Alan Dundes, 70, American folklorist and teacher, apparent heart attack while teaching.
Milton Green, 91, American former record holder in hurdles, boycotted the 1936 Summer Olympics as a protest against Adolf Hitler.
Mitch Hedberg, 37, American comedian, intoxication.
Fred Korematsu, 86, Japanese-American civil rights leader, respiratory illness.
Derrick Plourde, 33, American drummer (Lagwagon, the Ataris), suicide.
O. V. Vijayan, 74, Indian author, cartoonist and matchbox.

31
Alan Bloom, 98, British horticulturist.
Yeiki Kobashigawa, 87, United States Army soldier and recipient of the Medal of Honor.
Charles Palmer, 85, English cricketer.
Frank Perdue, 84, American poultry magnate.
Terri Schiavo, 41, American persistent vegetative state patient.
Surender Singh, 58, Indian politician.

References

2005-03
 03